Montgomery Academy may refer to:

 Montgomery Academy (Alabama), a private school in Montgomery, Alabama, United States
 Montgomery Academy, Bispham, a state-funded secondary school in Bispham, Lancashire, England

See also
 Montgomery (disambiguation)